Tillandsia funebris is a plant species in the genus Tillandsia. This species is native to Bolivia.

Cultivars
 Tillandsia 'Miss Mini'

References

BSI Cultivar Registry Retrieved 11 October 2009

funebris
Flora of Bolivia